Blackrock Mountain can refer to:

 Blackrock Mountain (Alberta), in the Canadian Rockies in Alberta
 Black Rock Mountain (Arizona), in Mohave County, northwest Arizona
 Blackrock Mountain (Canada), a mountain on the Continental Divide on the British Columbia-Alberta border in Canada
 Black Rock Mountain State Park, Georgia, United States
 Black Rock Mountain, County Wexford, Ireland
 Black Rock, Co. Limerick, Ireland
 "Blackrock Mountain", an expansion to the video game Hearthstone, set in the Warcraft universe.